Cheryl A. Coakley-Rivera (previously Cheryl A. Rivera) is an American politician from the Commonwealth of Massachusetts. A Democrat, she served in the Massachusetts House of Representatives from 1999 to 2014.

In the legislature, she represented the Tenth Hampden district, centered on her hometown of Springfield. She is chaired the Joint Committee on Labor and Workforce Development.

She is an attorney and earned a Juris Doctor (J.D.) from Western New England College School of Law in 1995. She had previously earned a BA at Northeastern University. In 1998, following the death of Anthony M. Scibelli, who had held the seat for 40 years, Coakley-Rivera ran successfully for the House of Representatives, becoming the first Hispanic woman elected to the Massachusetts legislature. She took office the following January and has been re-elected biennially ever since, taking 85% of the vote in 2008.

She resigned in 2014 to accept an appointment as assistant clerk of the Hampden County Superior Court.

She was previously known as Cheryl A. Rivera. In March 2006, she changed her name in honor of her mother, Barbara Coakley Rivera, who had died the previous year. Her sister and nephew similarly changed their names.

References

Democratic Party members of the Massachusetts House of Representatives
Politicians from Springfield, Massachusetts
Living people
Western New England University alumni
Northeastern University alumni
Lesbian politicians
LGBT state legislators in Massachusetts
Year of birth missing (living people)
Women state legislators in Massachusetts
21st-century LGBT people
21st-century American women